Gabriel de Gravone (1887–1972) was a French stage actor. He acted in forty films during the silent era, as well as directing one which he also starred in.

Selected filmography
 La Roue (1923)
 Mimi Pinson (1924)
 The Fiery Cavalcade (1925)
 Michel Strogoff (1926)

References

Bibliography
 Abel, Richard. The Ciné Goes to Town: French Cinema, 1896-1914. University of California Press, 1994.

External links

1887 births
1972 deaths
French male stage actors
French male film actors
French male silent film actors
People from Ajaccio